Staphylococcal nuclease domain-containing protein 1 also known as 100 kDa coactivator or Tudor domain-containing protein 11 (TDRD11) is a protein that in humans is encoded by the SND1 gene. SND1 is a main component of RISC complex and plays an important role in miRNA function. SND1 is Tudor domain containing protein and Tudor Proteins are highly conserved proteins and even present in Drosophila melanogaster. SND1 is also involved in Autism.

Clinical significance 

SND1 acts as oncogene in many cancers and in hepatocellular carcinoma progression. SND1 promotes tumor angiogenesis in human hepatocellular carcinoma through a novel pathway which involves NF-kappaB and miR-221. SND1 promotes migration and invasion via angiotensin II type 1 receptor and TGFβ signaling. SND1 expression is regulated by Mir-184 in gliomas.

Interactions 

SND1 has been shown to interact with MYB,
 PIM1, POLR2A, RBPJ,  and STAT6.

SND1 also interacts with G3BP (stress granule protein) and AEG-1.

References

Further reading